The JSAC Jersey Half Marathon (currently known as "The Modern Hotels Jersey Half Marathon") is an annual half marathon staged Jersey, Channel Islands. It is organised by the Jersey Spartan Athletics Club.

History
The 2011 event was held on 20 November 2011 as well as 17th of 2013.

The course
The course starts and finishes at FB Fields in St. Clement, Jersey, and is set out over the east of the island.

See also
Jersey Marathon
Jersey Half Marathon

References

Sport in Jersey
Half marathons